Sauromalus ater, also known as the common chuckwalla, is a species of lizard in the family Iguanidae.  It inhabits the Sonoran and Mojave Deserts of the Southwestern United States and northwestern Mexico. Its range extends from eastern California, Utah, and Nevada south to Baja California and Sonora.

Taxonomy

The common name "chuckwalla" (or chuckawalla) is derived from the Shoshone word tcaxxwal, or caxwal, the form used by the Cahuilla of southeastern California.

Its generic name, Sauromalus, is said to be a combination of two ancient Greek words: sauros meaning "lizard"  and omalus meaning "flat". The proper ancient Greek word for "flat" is however homalos (ὁμαλός) or homalēs (ὁμαλής). Its specific name is ater, Latin for "black" or "dark"

Its original epithet was Sauromalus obesus; although that name is no longer officially recognized, it is still very common in the literature and it remains in many standard natural history references for North America. In 1998, Bradford D. Hollingsworth examined variations in Sauromalus and concluded that only five species should be recognized. He regarded S. obesus as conspecific with S. ater, and he used S. ater, which has priority, as the specific name of the combined taxon. No subspecies of S. ater are currently recognized.  Based primarily on the extensive use of the name S. obesus, a petition to give that name precedence over that of S. ater was submitted to the ICZN.  However, this reasoning was dubious and the priority of S. ater was maintained.  In 2004, ICZN ruled that the name Sauromalus ater was first described by zoologist Auguste Duméril in 1856, thus had precedence over the name Sauromalus obesus which was not named until 1858 by Baird.

Description 
The common chuckwalla is a large, flat-bodied lizard with a large, rounded belly, and a wide-based, blunt-tipped tail. Small scales cover its body, with larger scales protecting the ear openings. The coloration of these lizards varies by location and between juveniles and adults, as well as between males and females. In adult males, the head, shoulder, and pelvic regions are black, while the midbody is light tan speckled with brown. Adult females are brownish in color with a scattering of dark red spots. Young chuckwallas have four or five broad bands across their bodies, and three or four on the tail which are lost in adulthood by males, but retained somewhat by females.

Behavior
Harmless to humans, these lizards are known to run from potential threats.  When disturbed, the chuckwalla enters crevices between rocks and inflates its lungs using a gular pump. Lung inflation distends its body and wedges the lizard tightly in place.

Males are seasonally and conditionally territorial; an abundance of resources tends to create a hierarchy based on size, with one large male dominating the area's smaller males. Chuckwallas use a combination of color and physical displays, namely "push ups", head-hobbing, and gaping of the mouth to communicate and defend their territory.

Chuckwallas are diurnal animals, and as they are ectothermic, spend much of their mornings and cooler days basking.  These lizards are well adapted to desert conditions; they are active at temperatures up to 102 °F (39 °C). Chuckwallas brumate during cooler months and emerge in February.

Mating occurs from April to July, with five to 16 eggs laid between June and August. The eggs hatch in late September.

Diet 
Primarily herbivorous, the chuckwalla eats creosote bush flowers, leaves, fruit, and occasionally insects.

Gallery

References

External links

Taxonomic controversy
Nature Serve

ater
Reptiles described in 1856
Taxa named by Auguste Duméril
Reptiles of Mexico
Reptiles of the United States
Fauna of the Sonoran Desert
Fauna of the Mojave Desert
Fauna of the Colorado Desert
Fauna of the Southwestern United States